"To the Stars" is a song by the London-based dubstep and electronic rock band Modestep, and the third single from their debut studio album Evolution Theory. The single was released on 4 November 2011 in the United Kingdom as a digital download. It peaked at number 45 in the UK Singles Chart.

Music video
The video was released on 17 October 2011 and is 4 minutes long. At the start of the video it features panning shots of a messy but temporarily vacant room with a video of Modestep performing the song playing on a computer in the room. Just before the chorus begins, the video moves away from the house upwards gradually into space, revealing the fact the house is located in Brazil. From then on the video features slow motion footage of the band performing against a dark background and footage of various galaxies and nebulae, including planetary nebulae and the famous Horsehead Nebula which is shown near the end of the space sequence, at which point the camera returns downwards to the house again and the video ends.

A video featuring the Break The Noize & The Autobots remix was uploaded onto YouTube by UKF Dubstep before the original video on 5 October 2011. The video shows the band backstage, on the road, moshing and at various concerts which they played at during the summer of 2011.

Track listing

Chart performance

Release history

References

2011 singles
Modestep songs
Polydor Records singles
2011 songs